Lithuania national basketball team competed in 2012 Olympic Games after qualifying into it during 2012 FIBA World Olympic Qualifying Tournament.

Group play

Quarter-final

References

Lithuania
2012
Olympics